St Andrew's and St Bride's High School is a Roman Catholic school in East Kilbride, Scotland. The current head teacher is Fiona Mullen. The school opened in 2007, and as of October 2020, had a roll of 1,523 pupils. The new buildings are adjacent to St Bride's Roman Catholic church, built in 1964 by Gillespie, Kidd & Coia.  The school and church fall under the Diocese of Motherwell.

History
The school was formed by the merger of two earlier schools, St Brides RC High School originally located at the Platthorn Drive site, and St Andrews RC High School located at Scholar's Gate in the Greenhills area of East Kilbride.

Opened in 1956 as a junior secondary and primary school, St Bride's was located close to the town centre consisting of one main building, with a separate Art block and three technical blocks. The advent of comprehensive education in 1967, meant that Catholic pupils would attend the school, as there would be no qualifying examination for senior secondary schools and so a further Science block and a  Technical Block were built in 1970 and a large "New Block" with a Business studies block were opened in 1971. Later, in 1975/6 a large P.E.Block was built to complete the campus. At its largest, around 1977, the school was second largest in Scotland, with 2,220 pupils, but the opening of St. Andrew's High in 1978 reduced this. It was a state comprehensive mixed gender school with 893 pupils aged 12–18 years (1999 data).

In 1975 St Brides RC High School exceeded the capacity of its Platthorn Drive campus and as an interim measure took over the buildings of the then closed Old High School located at Old Mill Road in the East Mains area approximately one mile from the Platthorn Drive campus.  This annex site was used to house the first-year intake for 1975, 1976 & 1977.  The Old Mill Road site is now part of the South Lanarkshire College.

South Lanarkshire Council were accused of threatening academic standards by choosing to merge two academically very different schools.  In 2002 St Bride's came 24th for Higher results in the national league table of 350 schools, while St Andrew's came in 227th place.

Catchments
There are currently 6 primary schools who are associated with St Andrew's and St Bride's:

St Hilary's Primary School in St Leonards, East Kilbride
St Leonard's Primary School in St Leonards, East Kilbride
St Kenneth's Primary School in West Mains
Our Lady of Lourdes Primary School in Westwood
St Louise Primary School in The Murray
St Vincent's Primary School In Greenhills

References

External links
St Andrew's And St Bride's High School's page on Scottish Schools Online
School Website

Catholic secondary schools in South Lanarkshire
Secondary schools in South Lanarkshire
Buildings and structures in East Kilbride
2007 establishments in Scotland
Educational institutions established in 2007